Herbulotiana zorobella is a moth in the family Depressariidae. It was described by Viette in 1988. It is found in Madagascar.

References

Moths described in 1988
Herbulotiana
Taxa named by Pierre Viette